HR 4138 is a single star in the constellation Carina. It has the Bayer designation K Carinae, abbreviated K Car, while HR 4138 is the star's designation in the Bright Star Catalogue. It has a white hue and is faintly visible to the naked eye with an apparent visual magnitude of +4.72. This star is located at a distance of approximately 261 light years from the Sun based on parallax measurements, and it is drifting further away with a radial velocity of +7.5 km/s. Judging from its motion through space, it is a candidate member of the Sirius supercluster.

This object is a superficially normal A-type star. However, there is some disagreement over the evolutionary state of the star, as it has received luminosity classifications of a subgiant, main sequence, and a giant star. Unexpectedly for an A-type star, a magnetic field has been detected. It is around 400 million years old and has a low projected rotational velocity of 12 km/s.

References

A-type main-sequence stars
Circumstellar disks

Carina (constellation)
Carinae, K
Durchmusterung objects
091375
051438
4138